In Your House 15: A Cold Day in Hell was the 15th In Your House professional wrestling pay-per-view (PPV) event produced by the World Wrestling Federation (WWF, now WWE). It took place on May 11, 1997, at the Richmond Coliseum in Richmond, Virginia. The PPV portion of the show featured five matches, plus a match on the Free for All pre-show and a dark match after the main event match.

The main event of the show featured The Undertaker defending the WWF Championship against Stone Cold Steve Austin. The show also featured the in ring debut of former Mixed Martial Arts champion Ken Shamrock as he took on Vader on the under card.

With the launch of the WWE Network in 2014, this show became available on demand, but does not include the Free for All pre-show nor the dark match held after the main show.

Background
In Your House was a series of monthly pay-per-view (PPV) shows first produced by the World Wrestling Federation (WWF, now WWE) in May 1995. They aired when the promotion was not holding one of its then-five major PPVs (WrestleMania, King of the Ring, SummerSlam, Survivor Series, and Royal Rumble), and were sold at a lower cost. In Your House 15: A Cold Day in Hell took place on May 11, 1997, at the Richmond Coliseum in Richmond, Virginia. The name of the show was based on the rivalry between Stone Cold Steve Austin and The Undertaker.

Event

During the Free For All pre-show, Bret Hart, Jim Neidhart, Owen Hart, the British Bulldog and Brian Pillman were interviewed backstage, claiming they bought tickets for the show to watch the Stone Cold Steve Austin match later in the night.

During the PPV, Ahmed Johnson faced off against all three members of the Nation of Domination (NOD) in a Gauntlet match. Before the match begun, WWF president Gorilla Monsoon came to ringside and ejected any member of the Nation of Domination that was not wrestling, forcing manager Clarence Mason, D'Lo Brown and others to leave ringside. Johnson pinned Crush in the first match in just over five minutes. The second match ended in a disqualification when Savio Vega hit Johnson with a chair repeatedly. The deliberate disqualification was to set Johnson up as an easy victim for NOD leader Faarooq. Faarooq faked an arm injury and then quickly attacked Johnson's knee gaining a fast victory. 

The match between former Ultimate Fighting Championship champion Ken Shamrock and Vader featured mixed rules as a hybrid between wrestling and MMA that would only allow someone to win by submission or knock out. During the match, Shamrock accidentally broke Vader's nose with a series of knee strikes to Vader's face, causing Vader to strike Shamrock with a stiff lariat. In the end, Shamrock forced Vader to submit to an Ankle lock submission hold.

The Hart Foundation made their presence known during the main event between The Undertaker and Stone Cold Steve Austin. At one point, when it looked like Austin was about to win, Pillman reached over and rang the bell prematurely, causing a distraction. In the end, the Undertaker pinned Steve Austin, followed moments later by Neidhart, Owen Hart, Bulldog and Pillman attacking both wrestlers. Moments later, Steve Austin knocked Bret Hart out of his wheel chair and then used one of Hart's crutches as a weapon to chase all the members of the Hart Foundation off.

Results

References

15: A Cold Day in Hell
1997 in Virginia
Events in Virginia
Professional wrestling in Richmond, Virginia
1997 WWF pay-per-view events
May 1997 events in the United States